The Cowra Shire is a local government area in the Central West region of New South Wales, Australia. The Shire is located adjacent to the Lachlan River, the Mid-Western Highway and the Lachlan Way.

The largest town and council seat is Cowra. The municipality also has a number of small villages: Billimari, Darbys Falls, Gooloogong, Morongla, Noonbinna, Wattamondara, Woodstock, and Wyangala.

The mayor of Cowra Shire Council is Bill West.

Council

Cowra Shire Council has nine councillors elected proportionally as a single ward. All councillors are elected for a fixed four-year term of office. The mayor is elected by the councillors at the first meeting of the council. The most recent by-election was held on 23 February 2013, and the makeup of the council is as follows:

The current Council is:

References

External links

 
Local government areas of New South Wales
1980 establishments in Australia
Cowra